Calisto grannus is a butterfly of the family Nymphalidae. It is endemic to Hispaniola, where it is generally found on altitudes above 1000 meters.

The larvae feed on various grasses.

Subspecies
Calisto grannus grannus
Calisto grannus amazona González, 1987
Calisto grannus dilemma González, 1987
Calisto grannus dystacta González, 1987
Calisto grannus micheneri Clench, 1944
Calisto grannus micrommata Schwartz & Gali, 1984
Calisto grannus phoinix González, 1987
Calisto grannus sommeri Schwartz & Gali, 1984

Gallery

References

Butterflies described in 1939
Calisto (butterfly)